Complete Genomics is a life sciences company that has developed and commercialized a DNA sequencing platform for human genome sequencing and analysis. This solution combines the company's proprietary human genome sequencing technology with its informatics and data management software to provide finished variant reports and assemblies at Complete Genomics’ own commercial genome center in Mountain View, California.

History
Complete Genomics was founded in March 2006 by Clifford Reid, Radoje (Rade) Drmanac, and John Curson. Clifford Reid was the chairman, president and chief executive officer of Complete Genomics before leaving in 2015 to setup Genos, a spinoff of Complete Genomics' consumer division.

In February 2009, Complete Genomics announced that it had sequenced its first human genome and submitted the resulting variant data to the National Center for Biotechnology Information database. Then, in November 2009, Complete Genomics published sequence data for three human genomes in the journal Science. By the end of 2009, Complete Genomics had sequenced 50 human genomes. To date, the company has sequenced more than 20,000 genomes.

The resulting data has supported research in diverse areas such as screening of embryos, detection of genetic relationships, neurology, aging, a novel Mendelian disease with neuromuscular and cardiac involvement, eating disorders, Prader-Willi syndrome and autism, ophthalmology, and oncology. In 2014, a collaboration among Radboud University (The Netherlands), Maastricht University Medical Centre (The Netherlands), Central South University (China) and Complete Genomics identified major causes of intellectual disability using whole genome sequencing.

In 2016, Complete Genomics contributed over 184 phased human genomes to George Church's Personal Genome Project. In 2019, they published on their new single-tube long fragment read (stLFR) technology, enabling construction of long DNA molecules from short reads using a combinatorial process of DNA barcoding. This enables phasing, SV detection, scaffolding, and cost-effective diploid de novo genome assembly, from second generation sequencing technology.

In March 2013 Complete Genomics was acquired by BGI-Shenzhen, a genomics services company in Shenzhen, Guangdong, China. After the acquisition Complete Genomics moved to San Jose, and in June 2018 become part of MGI, the instruments manufacturing business of BGI.

Technology platform
Complete Genomics’ proprietary human genome sequencing technology is optimized for the exclusive study of human DNA, providing assembled sequences and variation files. The technology relies on DNA nanoball sequencing, which assembles short sequences of DNA into a full genome. It is designed to use lower volumes and concentrations of reagents than existing systems, and have large numbers of base reads per image.

References

External links 

Biotechnology companies of the United States
Biotechnology companies established in 2006
Genomics companies
Companies based in Mountain View, California
Technology companies based in the San Francisco Bay Area
2006 establishments in California
2013 mergers and acquisitions